Fenny Stratford is a constituent town of Milton Keynes, Buckinghamshire, England and in the Civil Parish of Bletchley and Fenny Stratford. Originally an independent town, it was included in the Milton Keynes "designated area" in 1967. From 1895 it formed an urban district with Bletchley, until 1974 when it became part of the (then) District of Milton Keynes. It is located at the southern edge of Milton Keynes, just east of Bletchley and west of the A5.

Today 
 
A mixture of old buildings and new developments, Fenny Stratford is a small town on the edge of Milton Keynes. Its market may be long gone but it hosts various shops, restaurants, pubs, newsagents, and hotels  centered mainly around Aylesbury Street. There is an LGBT friendly night club on Watling Street. Fenny Stratford railway station, one of the seven railway stations that serve the Milton Keynes urban area, is served by the (Bletchley - Bedford) Marston Vale Line.

History

The town name is an Old English language word that means 'marshy ford on a Roman road'. The Roman road in this case is the Watling Street. There are traces of the Romano-British settlement  (or ) at Dropshot Farm, on the edge of the present day occupation. (Possibly the oldest known gold coin in Britain was found here in 1849, a gold stater of the mid-second century BCE. The town was recorded in manorial rolls in 1252 as Fenni Stratford. King JamesI awarded a market charter in 1608, making it formally a town.

Being an ancient market town, Fenny Stratford was the location of a weekly market for many years until 1665 when the town was badly hit by the bubonic plague. As a result, the main London-Chester route that ran through the town on Watling Street was diverted away from it, and the market ceased to exist. The market was never reinstated: the town was very much in ruins by the early eighteenth century, and had by this time been joined with both Bletchley and Simpson, being commonly considered a hamlet of the former.

Parish church

On St Martin's Day 1724, the first stone was laid of the new parish church of Fenny Stratford, marking a fresh start in the town's history. Browne Willis, a historian of the day, had raised the funds for its construction. The Church was built on the site of the old chantry chapel of St. Margaret and St. Catherine at Fenny Stratford. He erected the church as a memorial to his grandfather Thomas Willis, a famous physician, who lived in St. Martin's Lane in the parish of St. Martin-in-the-Fields in London, and who died on St. Martin's day, 11 November 1675. To perpetuate his own memory, Browne Willis arranged for a sermon to be preached at St. Martin's Church on each St. Martin's Day, for which a fee was payable. During his lifetime, he also celebrated the occasion with a dinner attended by local clergy and gentry, an event which has continued to the present day.

The Fenny Poppers 
The Fenny Poppers are six small ceremonial cannon which date from this time and are still fired ceremonially (with blank charges) today.

There is no record of their first use. In 1740, Browne Willis bought a house in Aylesbury Street, Fenny Stratford and the rent from this was used to pay for the sermon and gunpowder. Following his death in 1760, the traditions were carried on and later documented.

All six Poppers were re-cast by the Eagle Foundry, Northampton in 1859, after one of them burst. They are still in use today, and were recently examined and x-rayed to ensure there are no cracks. During their long history, many sites have been used for this battery. These include the Canal Wharf, land behind the Church, St, Martin's Hall, the Churchyard and now the Leon Recreation Ground, which was once part of the lands belonging to the Chantry.

The Poppers each weigh about 19 pounds (8.5 kg). The bore, 6" by 1¾" (152 mm x 44 mm) will take one ounce (28g) of gunpowder, which is plugged with well-rammed newspaper. They are fired three times on St. Martin's Day (11 November): noon, 2pm and 4pm. There is of course no connection with Remembrance Day (also 11 November). In 1901 they were fired to mark the death of Queen Victoria; the 81 salvoes were heard as far away as Olney.

On 1 January 2000, at 11am the Poppers were fired to mark the beginning of the second millennium.

At 2pm on 4 August 2000, a salute of six Poppers was fired to celebrate the 100th birthday of the Queen Mother.

At 2pm on 5 June 2012 a salute was fired to mark the  Diamond Jubilee of Queen Elizabeth II.

Invention of the Diesel Engine in Fenny Stratford 
The world's first successful heavy oil engines were invented and built by Herbert Akroyd Stuart in Fenny Stratford. There is a plaque commemorating this at the westerly end of Denmark Street in Fenny Stratford opposite The Foundry public house – though the location of Akroyd Stuart's workshop is usually given as "Bletchley", which is a larger town adjoining Fenny Stratford. These engines were precursors to what is now known as the Diesel engine: Rudolf Diesel based his designs (1892) on Akroyd Stuart's proven inventions (1890) of direct (airless) fuel injection and compression ignition. An experimental model was tried out at the offices of the Fenny Stratford Times Newspaper, and the first production models were installed at the nearby Great Brickhill Waterworks where they were in operation from 1892 to 1923. (It has been argued that engines of this type might have become known as "Akroyds", had Diesel not been a rather paranoid person not prone to giving other inventors credit.)

Waterways

The Grand Union Canal runs through the southern outskirts of the town and Fenny Lock is located in Simpson Road area to the east of Watling Street. This was deemed necessary by the canal engineers because the next section northwards of the canal could not be made adequately watertight at reasonable cost without it. The level persists from this lock for eleven miles, through what is now Milton Keynes, through to the next lock at Cosgrove. A little further south of the canal bridge, Watling Street crosses the river Ouzel (a tributary of the river Great Ouse: it was the marshy ford across this river that gave the town its name.

Fenny Stratford is bordered by North Street, Bletchley Leisure Centre, Knowles School/Leon Recreational Ground and the Fenny Allotments from the west, the Rail line, Watling street and Denbigh East from the north, Water Eaton Brook by the south and the River Ouzel and Grand Union Canal from the east.

Manor Fields
Manor Fields sports ground to the south of the town (and just across the Grand Union Canal from Bletchley's 'Trees' estate) is home to Bletchley Town, Bletchley RUFC, the Irish Centre and other activities. The Roman town lay either side of Watling Street and thus Manor Fields lies on part of it.

References

External links

 St Martin's Church website

Towns in Buckinghamshire
Milton Keynes